Isaac Grainger (born 26 May 1992) is a New Zealand rower. He came fourth at the 2015 World Rowing Championships with the men's eight, qualifying the boat for the 2016 Olympics. He came sixth with his team at the eight competition in Rio de Janeiro.

References

Living people
1992 births
New Zealand male rowers
Olympic rowers of New Zealand
Rowers at the 2016 Summer Olympics
21st-century New Zealand people